In the classification of eukaryotes (living organisms with a cell nucleus), Cabozoa was a taxon proposed by Cavalier-Smith. It was a putative clade comprising the Rhizaria and Excavata.  More recent research places the Rhizaria with the Alveolata and Stramenopiles instead of the Excavata, however, so the "Cabozoa" is polyphyletic.

See also
 Corticata

References 

Obsolete eukaryote taxa
Bikont unranked clades